Flesh is a 2020 Indian crime thriller web series written by Pooja Ladha Surti and directed by Danish Aslam. The story of this series is based on human trafficking and stars Swara Bhaskar in the lead role.

Plot summary

Cast 
 Swara Bhaskar as ACP Radha Nautiyal
 Mahima Makwana as Zoya, a 16-year-old NRI teenage girl and also daughter of Reba and Shekhar who goes missing.
 Akshay Oberoi as Taj, King-pin of human trafficking.
 Vidya Malvade as Reba Gupta, Zoya's mother 
 Yudhishtir Urs as Shekhar Gupta, Zoya's father.
 Siddhant Behl as Naman, Assistant of ACP Radha and also a member of Anti-trafficking.
 Bijou Thaangjam as Bali, the care taker and Dog trainer of Taj
 Moinak Dutta
 Shashie Vermaa as ACP Bond
 Nataša Stanković as Paul Madam (NIA Agent)
 Rahoul Dutta as Simon

Production 
The first motion poster featuring Mahima Makwana, Swara Bhaskar and Akshay Oberoi was launched on 10 August 2020 by Eros Now social handle.
On 11 August 2020, the trailer of the show was released.

Critical reception
Flesh received generally positive reviews from critics. Shubhra Gupta, one of the authors of The Indian Express, writes, "Flesh smartly manages to maintain that very tough balance, between showing us repulsive, depraved people doing repulsive, depraved things, and keeping us watching, despite ourselves." Saibal Chatterjee of NDTV particularly praised the performance of the lead actors, Swara Bhaskar and Akshay Oberoi.

References

External links
 
 Flesh on Eros Now

Hindi-language web series
2020 web series debuts
Crime thriller web series